Barnabas Lindars  (born Frederick Chevallier Lindars; 1923–1991) was an English New Testament scholar. Born 11 June 1923, Lindars was educated at Altrincham Grammar School and then studied at St John's College, Cambridge. He was ordained as an Anglican priest in 1949. After teaching at the University of Cambridge (where he was Dean of Jesus College), Lindars served as Rylands Professor of Biblical Criticism and Exegesis at the University of Manchester from 1978 to 1990.

In 1988, It Is Written: Scripture Citing Scripture: Essays in Honour of Barnabas Lindars, SSF was published. It included contributions from C. K. Barrett, Richard Bauckham, G. K. Beale, D. A. Carson, R. E. Clements, and Morna D. Hooker. Lindars died on 21 October 1991.

References

1923 births
1991 deaths
20th-century English Anglican priests
Academics of the Victoria University of Manchester
Alumni of St John's College, Cambridge
Anglican biblical scholars
British biblical scholars
Fellows of Jesus College, Cambridge
New Testament scholars
People educated at Altrincham Grammar School for Boys
Presidents of the Society for Old Testament Study